North Middlesex is a municipality in Middlesex County, Ontario, Canada.

The restructured municipality of North Middlesex was incorporated on January 1, 2001. This amalgamation joined five municipalities — the townships of East Williams, West Williams and McGillivray, the town of Parkhill and the village of Ailsa Craig — to form one municipal corporation. North Middlesex has a population of 6,658 as of the Canada 2011 Census.

North Middlesex is located in the north of Middlesex County, north of London, Ontario.

Communities

Ailsa Craig

Ailsa Craig is a community on the Ausable River. Ailsa Craig is best known for its annual Gala Days event. The town was the home of Earl Ross, the first non-American to win a NASCAR Cup Series race, which he did in 1974. Earl was also NASCAR Winston Cup Rookie of the year in 1974.

The winningest harness horse driver in the world also hails from the Ailsa Craig area. With over 10,000 wins, John Campbell is one of the youngest members to enter the Harness Horseman's Hall of Fame.

Ailsa Craig was named by the Craig family after a namesake island in the outer Firth of Clyde, Scotland, and the word is derived from the Gaelic, Aillse Creag, or Creag Ealasaid, meaning "Elizabeth's rock". In the early 20th century, Ailsa Craig was a thriving village with several hotels, mills and  served as the commercial hub for the farm businesses in the area.  Located on the Grand Trunk Railway, Ailsa Craig was once the second largest cattle shipping center in all of Canada surpassed only by Calgary, Alberta.  As a child, Norman Bethune often spent his summers in the village.

Parkhill

Parkhill owes its beginning to the coming of the railway. In 1859, the Grand Trunk Railway completed a line from St. Mary's to Sarnia. The following year the first Post Office and store were opened at the present site of Parkhill.

Parkhill was originally known as Westwood, named Swainsby in 1861 and finally Parkhill in 1863. Parkhill's growth was slow at first until a grist mill was constructed in the community. Other industries including saw mills, a foundry, a flax mill and a woollen mill became a part of Parkhill.  By 1871, the community had a population of 1500. Parkhill was incorporated as a village in 1872 and as a town in 1886.  Many fine old Victorian commercial buildings  such as the Cheapside Block and Gibbs Block can be found located along Main Street. Parkhill also has many handsome churches and houses throughout the town.  The township's administrative offices are located in Parkhill.

Just outside of the modern town of Parkhill, the Parkhill National Historic Site of Canada marks the location of the earliest indigenous archaeological site yet discovered in Ontario, with artifacts dating to approximately 8800 BC.

Other communities
The township also contains the communities of Beechwood, Bornish, Bowood, Brinsley, Carlisle, Corbett, Greenway, Hungry Hollow, Lieury, Moray, Mount Carmel, Nairn, Sable, Springbank, Sylvan and West McGillivray. The communities of Clandeboye, Lucan Crossing, Mooresville are divided by the municipal boundary with Lucan Biddulph.

Demographics

See also
List of townships in Ontario

Notable people

 James A. Macdonald (1862 – 1923), newspaper editor and minister

References

External links

Lower-tier municipalities in Ontario
Municipalities in Middlesex County, Ontario